The 2014 Festival Luxembourgeois du cyclisme féminin Elsy Jacobs was the seventh edition of a women's road racing event in Luxembourg. It was a stage race with a UCI rating of 2.1. It was the eighth stage race of the 2014 Women's Elite cycling calendar, and was the only race in Luxembourg, apart from the National Championships, on this calendar.

 achieved a clean sweep of all three stage wins and all four jerseys.

Teams
Twenty teams competed in the 2014 Festival Luxembourgeois du cyclisme féminin Elsy Jacobs. These included seventeen UCI Women's Teams, two national teams and one non-UCI team.

UCI teams
 Alé Cipollini
 Astana BePink
 
 RusVelo
 
 
 Team Giant–Shimano
 Futurumshop.nl–Zannata
 
 Top Girls Fassa Bortolo
 Vaiano Fondriest
 Hitec Products
 Bigla Cycling Team
 Orica–AIS
 Lointek
 Firefighters Upsala CK
 Poitou–Charentes.Futuroscope.86

National teams

Non-UCI teams
 Wielerclub De Sprinters Malderen

Stages

Prologue
2 May 2014 – Cessange, individual time trial (ITT)

Prologue Result and General Classification after Prologue

Stage 1
3 May 2014 – Garnich to Garnich,

Stage 2
4 May 2014 – Mamer to Mamer,

Classification leadership

References

2014 in women's road cycling
Women's road bicycle races
2014 in Luxembourgian sport